Félix Martínez Mata (born May 18, 1974) is a former Major League Baseball shortstop for the Kansas City Royals and Tampa Bay Devil Rays.

External links

1974 births
Living people
Águilas Cibaeñas players
Atlantic League Road Warriors players
Dominican Republic expatriate baseball players in the United States
Kansas City Royals players
Lancaster Barnstormers players

Major League Baseball players from the Dominican Republic
Major League Baseball shortstops
Newark Bears players
People from Nagua
Tampa Bay Devil Rays players
Charlotte Knights players
Durham Bulls players
Gulf Coast Royals players
Gigantes del Cibao players
Iowa Cubs players
Las Vegas 51s players
Olmecas de Tabasco players
Dominican Republic expatriate baseball players in Mexico
Omaha Golden Spikes players
Omaha Royals players
Orlando Rays players
Wichita Wranglers players
Wilmington Blue Rocks players